Cuscuta campestris, with the common names field dodder, golden dodder, large-seeded alfalfa dodder, yellow dodder and prairie dodder, is a parasitic plant which belongs to the family Convolvulaceae. It was formerly classified in the family Cuscutaceae.

It is native to central North America. It is a parasite of a wide range of herbaceous plants.

It is a pest of lucerne and other legumes. It has become a widespread weed in many countries. It is known as 'golden dodder' in Australia.

It has been confused in some recent literature with Cuscuta pentagona Engelmann, but the differences between the two species are clear.

Remarkably, the seeds of the plant have been found to become dispersed by waterfowl in significant numbers.

Lifestyle
Parasitic plants of the genus Cuscuta have little to no chlorophyll making them unable to undergo photosynthesis, a process by which plants make their own food. This makes them photosynthetically inactive. Cuscuta species are thus referred to as holoparasitic plants, as they depend on their host plant for nutrients. About 10-15 species of Cuscuta, out of the known 200, are considered agricultural weeds which wrap their vines around their hosts and obtain their nutrients from them through their extensions called haustoria. This mechanism for obtaining their food makes them very difficult to remove. Their growth has been cited to cause severe loss to crops that yield alfalfa, tomatoes, carrots and cranberry crops.

The life cycle of the Cuscuta starts with seed germination. The seedlings cannot survive for long periods of time hence, they find the appropriate plant stem by recognizing plant chemo-attractants. Cuscuta campestris is known for restraining the growth of their host plants and even inhibiting their flowering. This causes the host cell to eventually die. This mechanism gives them the ability to control other populations of weeds like Mikania micrantha. Another mechanism by which these dodders recognize which plants to use as hosts depends on the light that's reflected off the plant's surface. Cuscuta campestris is highly attracted to "far red light", which is a wavelength that is reflected by most plant surfaces. Dodders that were exposed to unfiltered light were able to attach to their host before their energy had been totally exhausted, but dodders that were only exposed to red light lost their way. This could be a technique by which to control C. campestris infestations if exposed to red light within the early stages of development, to avoid the spread and growth of the plant.

References

External links

 Calflora Database: Cuscuta campestris (Field dodder)
 GBIF−Species in GRIN Taxonomy: Cuscuta campestris

campestris
Flora of the Great Plains (North America)
Flora of the United States
Flora of the North-Central United States
Flora without expected TNC conservation status